Coney Island Fire Station Pumping Station is a historic pumping station located in Brooklyn, New York, New York. It was built in 1938 in the Moderne style.  It is a one-story, elliptical shaped building faced in limestone.  It sits on a granite base and has projecting porticos and metal doorways.

It was listed on the National Register of Historic Places in 1981.

References

Coney Island
Government buildings in Brooklyn
Government buildings on the National Register of Historic Places in New York City
Industrial buildings and structures in Brooklyn
Infrastructure completed in 1938
Moderne architecture in New York City
National Register of Historic Places in Brooklyn
Water infrastructure of New York City
Water supply pumping stations on the National Register of Historic Places